'''Cleveden Secondary School is located in Kelvinside in the West End of Glasgow.

The school
In 1973, the Glasgow High School for Girls, situated in the same building as the present school, began accepting both male and female pupils, and in 1975 was officially re-opened as Cleveden Secondary School. The school exists in its current form as the result of a merge between Cleveden and North Kelvinside Secondary Schools between 1998 and 2001.

The Head Teacher is Mrs Claire Wilson who was appointed on 9 October 2020.

It has recently won £1000 from two students winning the Bloodhound Racecar Challenge in 2016.

Feeder schools
Cleveden currently has ninefeeder schools, which cover a large area of the north-west of the city. They are Cadder Primary School, Caldercuilt Primary School, Dunard Primary School, Kelvindale Primary School, Maryhill Primary School, Parkview Primary School, Ruchill Primary School, Westercommon Primary School

Facilities
Following an extension and refurbishment, the school building was officially re-opened by the then First Minister, Jack McConnell, on 8 February 2002. The new extensions provide twenty-six teaching spaces including general classrooms, music, drama, sports and technical facilities, as well as administration offices. A striking new social space was added offering a dining and performing space for pupils. In addition to the general refurbishment of the existing school building, the works also included provision of a rationalised suite of eight ICT classrooms and thirteen departmental bases. Every teaching space, office and administration area now has ICT provision.

The renovated building now has thirty-one classrooms, eight dedicated ICT teaching areas, ten science labs, five technical rooms, five art and design rooms, three home economics rooms, three music rooms, gymnasium, games hall, fitness suite and swimming pool. The library was also revamped and a new IT Learning Centre was created to help pupils and teachers make the most of internet technology. The works also provided a new synthetic sports pitch within the school grounds and a further two grass pitches and one blaes pitch located at the nearby Kirklee site.

References

Secondary schools in Glasgow
Educational institutions established in 1975
1975 establishments in Scotland